René Iché (21 January 1897 – 23 December 1954) was a 20th-century French sculptor.

Life and work
René Iché was born in Sallèles-d'Aude, France. He fought in World War I, where he was injured and gassed. After the war, he earned a degree in law, but also studied sculpture with Antoine Bourdelle and architecture with Auguste Perret. In 1927, his pacific monument of Ouveillan (a Monumental Modern church in the South of France) was well received. During his first solo exhibition, at the art dealer Léopold Zborowski in 1931, two sculptures were acquired by the Musée National d'Art Moderne in Paris (now in the Centre Georges Pompidou) and the Museum Boijmans Van Beuningen in Rotterdam.

In 1928, he married his model Rosa Achard, known as Renée. His daughter Laurence, who later became a writer, was a model for some of his work.

Iché was a very good friend of Max Jacob, close to Guillaume Apollinaire, Picasso, Jacques Lipchitz, Zadkine and a childhood friend of Joë Bousquet. He sculpted the faces of André Breton, Paul Éluard and Federico García Lorca.

In his studio of Montparnasse, in 1937, he executed a Guernica sculpture on the day (27 April 1937) of the announcement of this event on the radio station. Upon completing the work he did not wish to exhibit it.

He was amongst the 200 pioneers of the French Resistance – he was in the Groupe du musée de l'Homme – during the summer of 1940 and participated at the Degenerate art exhibitions. He sculpted so La Déchirée (The Torn), which was brought to London and given to General Charles de Gaulle, became one of the symbols of the French Resistance.

He participated at the Venice Biennale in 1948 with Le Couple (Musée d'Art Moderne de la Ville de Paris) and received the Grand Prix de Sculpture in 1953 for Melpomène 36. His work was also part of the sculpture event in the art competition at the 1948 Summer Olympics. He was chosen to sculpt the Apollinaire Monument in Paris and an Auschwitz' Memorial in Poland, but both projects were interrupted by his premature death in Paris.

Iché's work is close to surrealism and like the sculptors Alberto Giacometti and Germaine Richier inherits an aesthetic born from the workshop of Antoine Bourdelle.

Film
Jean-Pierre Melville's film Army of Shadows (L'Armée des ombres, 1969) is based, like the novel of Joseph Kessel, on the Resistance network to which Iché belonged, Cohors-Asturies. The character of Luc Jardie (Paul Meurisse) is inspired by Iché.

See also
Art manifesto

References

Bibliographic Guide to Art and Architecture, 1978. G.K. Hall. Page 488.
Jane Clapp, Sculpture Index. 1970. Scarecrow Press. x pages. Page 459.
Robert Maillard, Dictionary of Modern Sculpture, 1962. Tudor. 310 pages. Page 141.
Michel Seuphor, The Sculpture of this Century, Dictionary of Modern Sculpture. 1959. Zwemmer. 372 pages. Page 282.
Julian Park, The culture of France in our time. 1954. Cornell University Press. 345 pages. Page 87
Daniel Trowbridge Mallett, Index of Artists, International-biographical Including Painters, Sculptors ... 1935. R.R. Bowker Co. 493 pages. . Page 136.

External links 
Official Website
French TV show (english subtitles), Guernica by René Iché
artist page
Pompidou Center

1897 births
1954 deaths
Modern sculptors
French surrealist artists
Recipients of the Croix de Guerre (France)
Recipients of the Legion of Honour
Artists from Paris
French military personnel of World War I
French Resistance members
School of Paris
20th-century French sculptors
French male sculptors
Olympic competitors in art competitions